Huaillaccocha (possibly from Quechua waylla meadow, qucha lake, "meadow lake") is a mountain in the Chila mountain range in the Andes of Peru, about  high. It is situated in the Arequipa Region, Caylloma Province, Tapay District. Huaillaccocha lies northwest of Surihuiri and Minaspata and southeast of Huallatane. The valley south of the mountain is named Kencohuaycco (possibly from Quechua for "zig-zag valley" or "zig-zag stream"). Its waters flow to the Molloco River, an affluent of the Colca River.

References 

Mountains of Peru
Mountains of Arequipa Region